Pilar is a municipality located in the Brazilian state of Alagoas. Its population was 35,212 (2020) and its area is 249 km². On March 28, 1876, Pilar carried out the last official execution of Brazil when it hanged the slave Francisco.

References

Municipalities in Alagoas